This is the discography of R&B and pop vocal group Boyz II Men. Boyz II Men have sold 25 million albums in the United States alone.

Albums

Studio albums

Compilation albums

Singles

"—" denotes releases that did not chart

Guest singles

Music videos

Notes

A  "Can't Let Her Go" did not enter the Hot R&B/Hip-Hop Songs chart, but peaked at number 28 on the Hot R&B/Hip-Hop Airplay chart.
B  "Doin' Just Fine" did not enter the Hot R&B/Hip-Hop Songs chart, but peaked at number 33 on the Hot R&B/Hip-Hop Airplay chart.

References

External links
 Boyz II Men - official website

Discography
Rhythm and blues discographies
Discographies of American artists
Soul music discographies